Michele Babchuk is a Canadian politician, who was elected to the Legislative Assembly of British Columbia in the 2020 British Columbia general election. She represents the electoral district of North Island as a member of the British Columbia New Democratic Party.

Prior to her election to the legislature, Babchuk was a municipal councillor in Campbell River.

Electoral Record

References

21st-century Canadian politicians
21st-century Canadian women politicians
British Columbia New Democratic Party MLAs
Women MLAs in British Columbia
People from Campbell River, British Columbia
British Columbia municipal councillors
Women municipal councillors in Canada
Living people
Year of birth missing (living people)